Summerside is a Canadian city in Prince County, Prince Edward Island.  It is the second largest city in the province and the primary service centre for the western part of the island.

History 
Summerside was officially incorporated as a town on April 1, 1877. On April 1, 1995, the Town of Summerside amalgamated with the incorporated communities of St. Eleanors and Wilmot. At the same time, the amalgamated Summerside annexed portions of the Community of Sherbrooke and the Lot 17 township. It was PEI's second incorporated city, after the provincial capital of Charlottetown.

Summerside is named for an inn owned by George Linkletter II, called Summer Side House.

Demographics

Economy 
The largest single employer within the city is the Summerside Tax Centre, a Government of Canada agency which principally processes the Goods and Services Tax (GST).

The Slemon Park business park (formerly a military airbase, CFB Summerside) hosts a concentration of several aerospace and transportation companies in former military buildings; Vector Aerospace Engine Services Atlantic (formerly Atlantic Turbines) repairs and overhauls Gas Turbine aircraft engines, Testori Americas produces interiors for aircraft and mass transit surface vehicles, and Honeywell manufactures and repairs parts for aircraft.

Amalgamated Dairies Limited is based in Summerside, founded in 1953 by six dairies as a co-operative and owned by dairy producers.

The outlying community of New Annan is home to the operations of Cavendish Farms, Prince Edward Island's largest private sector employer.  Cavendish Farms maintains two large frozen foods processing plants in New Annan.  Other outlying communities, such as Borden-Carleton have important employers for Summerside residents.

Since the closure of CFB Summerside in 1990, the city has been aggressive in courting new business opportunities and has created an Economic Development Office for the purpose of encouraging investment in the city. CFB Summerside is now the location of the Summerside Airport.

The Summerside area was at one time home to the world's largest concentration of Tame Silver Fox farms.  This is highlighted at the International Fox Museum.

Government 
The Summerside City Council is governed by a mayor and eight councillors who represent geographic areas called wards. The current mayor is Dan kutcher .

The Summerside Police Department is responsible for law enforcement within the city.  The East Prince Detachment of the Royal Canadian Mounted Police (RCMP) is located in North Bedeque, southeast of the city, however its only responsibility is to patrol, with the Summerside Police Department, the provincial Route 1A and Route 2 highways which pass along the east and north sides of the city.

Education
Summerside has seven English public schools: four elementary, two junior high, and one senior high school. The English Language School Board has an office in the city.

The city also has one French public school operated by the Commission scolaire de langue française.

Holland College, Prince Edward Island's community college system, maintains three facilities in Summerside;

 Summerside Waterfront Campus
 Marine Training Centre
 Atlantic Police Academy

The College of Piping and Celtic Performing Arts of Canada is also located in Summerside.

Energy 

The City of Summerside operates the only municipally-owned electric utility in Prince Edward Island.  After buying Charlottetown Light & Power in 1918, Maritime Electric consolidated electric distribution on the island. The company offered to take over the operations in Summerside, but backed down after citizens rejected various offers. The Summerside distribution grid has had an inter-connection with the Maritime Electric transmission grid since 1961.

Similar to Maritime Electric, Summerside Electric purchases the majority of its electricity from NB Power. In 2008, 76.5% of its power was acquired from NB Power. Although the Summerside Electric Commission has its own diesel engines at the Harvard Street Generating Station which can operate for several days independently of NB Power's supply, it is only used in exceptional circumstances such as when the NB Power or Maritime Electric transmission grids that feed the city are interrupted. They also run their engines on the last day of every month, for maintenance reasons and they sell that power back to NB Power.

In 2007 the city signed a 20-year agreement with a private wind energy company to supply about 23% of its electricity from a private wind farm in West Cape.

Construction started on a city owned wind farm in 2009 comprising four wind turbines, each capable of producing 3 megawatts of electricity.  The wind farm became fully operational in late 2009 and was immediately tied into the city's power.  This is Canada's first municipally owned and operated wind farm.  On an average day the wind farm produces about 25% of the electricity for the entire city.  At times when electricity usage in the city is low and the winds are high the wind farm has potential to produce more power than the city consumes.

The city is a supporter of clean electric vehicles.  As of September 2013 there are over 10 electric car charging stations in the city with another 30 to be installed in the coming months.  There are more charging stations per capita in Summerside than any other city in Canada.

Medical services 

The Prince County Hospital, located in the city's north end, is the main referral hospital in the western part of the province.
Island Emergency Medical Services operates two Advanced Life Support Paramedic Ambulances 24/7 from its base downtown.

Climate
Summerside has a humid continental climate (Köppen climate classification Dfb) with warm but somewhat moderate summers. It has cold winters with heavy snowfall, with some maritime moderation compared to areas farther inland.

Attractions

The Summerside Raceway is a standardbred harness racing track which is believed to be the oldest operating racing track in Canada, having opened in 1886. It is adjacent to Credit Union Place, the largest indoor sports facility in the province with a large hockey arena seating 4000, a bowling alley, a 25-metre swimming pool and other fitness and meeting facilities. Other attractions include the Harbourfront Theatre, the College of Piping and Celtic Performing Arts the Silver Fox Curling & Yacht Club, the Summerside Golf & Country Club, the PEI Sports Hall of Fame and Spinnakers' Landing.

The city has redeveloped several waterfront industrial sites, abandoned by the railway and marine terminal during the 1990s, into new parkland. A major reconstruction of the west end seawall has resulted in a new waterfront boardwalk for residents and visitors.

The former post office on Summer Street was designated a National Historic Site of Canada in 1983. The former railway station, designed by architect Charles Benjamin Chappell and built in 1927, was designated a National Historic Site of Canada in 2007.

The fish industry has also thrived recently and created a whole new division of tourism industry. According to 2016 demographics of the city, most of the tourism in recent years, is from families just wanting to go sail out on the ocean, and catch some fish to sell to a market, or bring home.

Notable people 

Darryl Boyce – former NHL player
Billy Bridges – Olympic para-athlete
Charles Cahill (1904–1954) – NHL player
Dave Cameron – former NHL player and coach
Alex Campbell – former premier of Prince Edward Island
John Chabot – former NHL player
Anita Daher - writer
Tanya Davis – musician
Noah Dobson – NHL player
Gerard Gallant – NHL Coach and former NHL player 
Forbes Kennedy – former NHL player
George Key – former mayor and former leader of the Prince Edward Island Progressive Conservative Party
Doug MacLean – former NHL coach
Catherine MacLellan – musician
Heather Moyse – two-time Olympic gold medalist in bobsled
Steve Ott – former NHL player
Basil Stewart – Mayor, member of the Order of Canada
Mark Strand – poet
Errol Thompson – former NHL player
Al Tuck – Musician
Nathan Wiley – Musician

Summerside was home for three years to the fictional Anne Shirley of the Anne of Green Gables series by Canadian author Lucy Maud Montgomery. Anne resides in the town while principal of Summerside High School, in the book Anne of Windy Poplars.

Media
Summerside has one radio station licensed to it, FM 102.1 CJRW-FM, which plays an adult contemporary format. CJRW is the only commercial radio station in the province whose studios are located outside of Charlottetown. Summerside is otherwise served by media based in Charlottetown. CBC Television has its Prince County bureau situated in Summerside.

Summerside's weekly newspaper is the Journal Pioneer. The province's French weekly newspaper, La Voix acadienne, is also based in the city.

Sister city
 – Stirling, Scotland

See also
List of historic places in Summerside, Prince Edward Island

Notes

References

External links

 
1840 establishments in Canada
Cities in Prince Edward Island
Populated coastal places in Canada
Populated places established in 1840